Boara Pisani is a comune (municipality) in the Province of Padua in the Italian region Veneto, located about  southwest of Venice and about  south of Padua.

Boara Pisani borders the following municipalities: Anguillara Veneta, Pozzonovo, Rovigo, Stanghella, Vescovana.

Demographic evolution

References

Cities and towns in Veneto